Peddamandyam is a village in Annamayya district of the Indian state of Andhra Pradesh. It is the mandal headquarters of Peddamandyam mandal.

Demographics 
Total    (2011). 	34,502 - males.   17,278 - females 	17,224
literacy  (2011) - Total  50.12% - males.  63.47% - females. 	36.77%

References 

Villages in Annamayya district
Mandal headquarters in Annamayya district